Nothing Personal is a 2001 Grammy Award winning album by Delbert McClinton.

Track listing
"Livin' It Down" (Delbert McClinton, Benmont Tench, Gary Nicholson - 2:39
"Gotta Get It Worked On" (McClinton, Max D. Barnes) - 4:00
"When Rita Leaves" (McClinton, Nicholson) - 4:26
"Squeeze Me In" (McClinton, Nicholson) - 2:53
"Birmingham Tonight" (McClinton, A.L. "Doodle" Owens) - 4:00
"Baggage Claim" (McClinton) - 3:27
"All Night Long" (McClinton, Mick Hany) - 4:03
"Don't Leave Home Without It" (McClinton, Nicholson, Sharon Vaughn) - 3:38
"Desperation" (McClinton) - 3:23
"Nothin' Lasts Forever" (McClinton) - 3:05
"Read Me My Rights" (McClinton, Johnny Neel) - 4:37
"All There Is of Me" (McClinton, Nicholson) - 5:35
"Watchin' the Rain" (McClinton) - 3:35

Charts

Weekly charts

Year-end charts

References

2001 albums
Delbert McClinton albums
New West Records albums